The  2014–15 UEFA Women's Champions League was the 14th edition of the European women's club football championship organised by UEFA. The final was played on 14 May 2015 at the Friedrich-Ludwig-Jahn-Sportpark, Berlin, Germany. Unlike recent years in which the Women's Champions League final was held in the same week as the men's Champions League final, the two finals were separated by almost a month, as the 2015 FIFA Women's World Cup starts in early June.

German side 1. FFC Frankfurt defeated French side Paris Saint-Germain 2–1 in the final to win a record fourth title.

Association team allocation
A total of 54 teams from 46 UEFA member associations participated in the 2014–15 UEFA Women's Champions League. The ranking based on the UEFA Women's Champions League association coefficient was used to determine the number of participating teams for each association:
Associations 1–8 each had two teams qualify.
All other associations, should they enter, each had one team qualify.

Since Wolfsburg, the winners of the 2013–14 UEFA Women's Champions League, already qualified through their domestic league, the title holder entry was not used.

Association ranking
For the 2014–15 UEFA Women's Champions League, the associations were allocated places according to their 2013 UEFA Women's Champions League association coefficient, which took into account their performance in European competitions from 2008–09 to 2012–13.

The Czech Republic overtook Austria for eighth place in the UEFA coefficient ranking and thus assured themselves a second entry.

Luxembourg (47th), Georgia (48th), Andorra, Armenia, Azerbaijan, Gibraltar, Liechtenstein, and San Marino (all no rank, as association did not enter in the five seasons used for computing coefficients) did not enter.

Teams
Unlike the men's Champions League, not every association enters a team and so the exact number of teams in each round can not be determined until the full entry list is known. For this season, the champions and runners-up from associations 1–8 and the champions from associations 9–14 enter the round of 32, while the remaining teams enter the qualifying round.

The following list the teams that qualified and entered this season's competition. Here CH denotes the national champion, RU the national runner-up, Ned 1 and Bel 1 the best placed Belgian and Dutch team in their joint league.

Faroese club KÍ has entered every past edition. Debutants are Liverpool (ENG), Brescia (ITA), Konin (POL), Amazones Dramas (GRE), FC Minsk (BLR), FC Hibernians (MLT), Rīgas (LAT) and Kočani (MKD).

Round and draw dates
UEFA has scheduled the competition as follows. In contrast to previous seasons, quarter-finals and semi-finals were played on weekends.

Qualifying round

The draw for the qualifying round was held on 26 June 2014. The 32 teams were allocated into four pots based on their 2014 UEFA club coefficients. They were drawn into eight groups of four, with the restriction that each group must contain one of the eight teams which were pre-selected as hosts.

In each group, teams played against each other in a round-robin mini-tournament at the pre-selected hosts. The matchdays were 9, 11 and 14 August 2014. The eight group winners and the two runners-up with the best record against the first and third-placed teams in their group advanced to the round of 32.

Group 1

Group 2

Group 3

Group 4

Group 5

Group 6

Group 7

Group 8

Ranking of second-placed teams
To determine the two best second-placed teams from the qualifying round which advanced to the round of 32, only the results of the second-placed teams against the first and third-placed teams in their group are taken into account.

Knockout phase

The main round was played as a straight knockout tournament with 32 teams. Each tie is played over two legs with the exception of the final, which is played at a single neutral venue.

Bracket

Round of 32
The draw for the round of 32 was held on 22 August 2014. Teams from the same association could not be drawn against each other. The first legs were played on 8 and 9 October, and the second legs were played on 15 and 16 October 2014.

The only unseeded team that won a tie was Gintra Universitetas after they beat Sparta Praha in the competition's first penalty shootout since the 2010 final.

|}

Round of 16
The round of 16 was drawn together with the round of 32. It was an open draw with no restrictions. The first legs were played on 8 and 9 November, and the second legs were played on 12 and 13 November 2014.

Glasgow became the first Scottish team to advance to the quarter-finals.

|}

Notes

Quarter-finals
The draw for the quarter-finals, semi-finals and final (to determine the "home" team for administrative purposes) was held on 19 November 2014. It was an open draw with no restrictions. The first legs were played on 21 and 22 March, and the second legs were played on 28 and 29 March 2015.

|}

Notes

Semi-finals
The first legs were played on 18 and 19 April and the second legs on 25 and 26 April 2015.

|}

Final

The final was played on 14 May 2015 at the Friedrich-Ludwig-Jahn-Sportpark in Berlin, Germany.

Statistics
Statistics include both qualifying round and knockout phase.

Top goalscorers
With 14 goals, Šašić set a new record in the Champions League era and tied the record including the Women's Cup era.

Top assists

Squad of the season
The UEFA technical study group selected the following 18 players as the squad of the tournament:

References

External links
2014–15 UEFA Women's Champions League
European league standings

 
2014-15
Women's Champions League
2014 in women's association football
2015 in women's association football